Retroplumidae is a family of heterotrematan crabs, placed in their own (monotypic) superfamily, Retroplumoidea.

Classification
Eight genera are recognised, of which all but two are only known from fossils:
Archaeopus † Rathbun, 1908
Bathypluma de Saint Laurent, 1989
Costacopluma † Collins & Morris, 1975
Cristipluma † Bishop, 1983a
Loerentheya † Lőrenthey, in Lőrenthey & Beurlen, 1929
Loerenthopluma † Beschin, Busulini, De Angeli & Tessier, 1996
Retrocypoda † Vía, 1959
Retropluma Gill, 1894

Ten species in two genera survive in the deep sea of the Indo-Pacific region:
Bathypluma chuni (Doflein, 1904)
Bathypluma forficula De Saint Laurent, 1989
Bathypluma spinifer De Saint Laurent, 1989
Retropluma denticulata Rathbun, 1932
Retropluma quadrata De Saint Laurent, 1989
Retropluma notopus (Alcock & Anderson, 1894)
Retropluma planiforma Kensley, 1969
Retropluma plumosa Tesch, 1918
Retropluma serenei De Saint Laurent, 1989
Retropluma solomonensis McLay, 2006

Fossil specimens ascribed to the Retroplumidae are known from the Late Cretaceous onwards, with Archaeopus antennatus in Coniacian–Maastrichtian rocks in California and Archaeopus ezoensis from Turonian–Maastrichtian rocks from Japan.

References

Crabs
Extant Maastrichtian first appearances
Decapod families